João da Paula (20 June 1930 – 28 October 2021) was a Portuguese rower. He competed in the men's eight event at the 1952 Summer Olympics. Da Paula died in Aveiro on 28 October 2021, at the age of 91.

References

External links
 

1930 births
2021 deaths
Olympic rowers of Portugal
Portuguese male rowers
Rowers at the 1952 Summer Olympics